Best of 50 Cent is the first greatest hits album by American rapper 50 Cent. It was released on March 31, 2017, by Shady Records, Aftermath Entertainment and Interscope Records. The compilation includes tracks from five of his previous studio albums: Power of the Dollar (2000), Get Rich or Die Tryin' (2003), The Massacre (2005), Curtis (2007) and Before I Self Destruct (2009). Also included are songs from the soundtrack to the film Get Rich or Die Tryin' (2005). It also includes the non-album singles "Get Up" and "I Get It In". Best of 50 Cent anthologizes the majority of the singles that 50 Cent released during his joint deals with Eminem's Shady, Dr. Dre's Aftermath, and major-label Interscope. This is the first Shady Records album that does not feature Eminem on a song.

Background and promotion
In 2002, 50 Cent signed a five-album deal with Interscope Records, which also included a greatest hits album. In June 2007, 50 Cent said: "Before I Self Destruct is scheduled to be released February 4, which is the anniversary of Get Rich or Die Tryin'. And it'll be my final studio recording for where I'm at, for my deal. I did a five-album deal, and the fifth album is a greatest-hits CD". However, 50 Cent planned to release one more studio album under Interscope, but went on to ask for his release in 2014, due to frustration with how the label was handling the promotion for Street King Immortal.

In February 2017, the album was announced by Universal Music Enterprises (UMe). It was announced for a March 31, 2017 release, 14 years after his breakthrough debut album Get Rich or Die Tryin'. The 18 track collection was also announced to be available in all formats, including digital, CD and LP, with the vinyl announced for an April 7, 2017 release.

Content
Best of 50 Cent contains 18 tracks spanning 11 years of music from 50 Cent's career, including collaborative work with Nate Dogg, Olivia, Justin Timberlake and other artists. Four tracks come from Curtis, the most to be featured from one album. "How to Rob", representing the oldest material on the compilation, is the only song from 50 Cent's unreleased 2000 album Power of the Dollar. "In da Club", "21 Questions" and "P.I.M.P.", all appeared on 50 Cent's 2003 major-label debut album Get Rich or Die Tryin. "Hustler's Ambition", "Best Friend" and "Window Shopper", were all songs included on Music from and Inspired by the Motion Picture Get Rich or Die Tryin'

Track listing 
Track listing adapted from AllMusic, including entries for Power of the Dollar, Get Rich or Die Tryin, The Massacre, and Music from and Inspired by the Motion Picture Get Rich or Die Tryin. "How to Rob" contains the unreleased version containing the diss to Mariah Carey and Tommy Mottola.

Charts

Weekly charts

Year-end charts

Certifications

See also
 List of greatest hits albums

References

2017 greatest hits albums
50 Cent albums
Aftermath Entertainment compilation albums
Interscope Records compilation albums
Shady Records compilation albums
Compilation albums by American artists
Gangsta rap compilation albums
East Coast hip hop compilation albums